Henry Schick was a pioneer barn-builder of Idaho.  He was a German-Russian immigrant.

A number of his works are listed on the U.S. National Register of Historic Places.

Works include:
T. P. Bowlby Barn, built 1912, NE of Buhl, Idaho (Schick, Henry), NRHP-listed
Dau-Webbenhorst Barn, built 1913, SE of Buhl, Idaho (Schick, Henry), NRHP-listed
Art and Frieda Maxwell Barn, built 1915, SE of Buhl, Idaho (Schick, Henry), NRHP-listed
Henry Schick Barn, built 1914, SE of Buhl, Idaho (Schick, Henry), NRHP-listed

See also
Schick-Ostolasa Farmstead, 5213 Dry Creek Rd. Boise, ID Schick, Philip L.

References

American people of German-Russian descent
American architects
People from Idaho
Year of death missing
Year of birth missing